In 1888–89, Everton F.C. was a founding member of the Football League and competed in the first edition of the competition. The team finished eighth, avoiding re-election by a single place.

Regular First team

Teams at the time played a 2–3–5 formation. Thus, Dobson and Ross were "full-backs" while Weir, Holt, and Farmer were "halfbacks". However, Everton fielded by far the most unsettled side of all the twelve original Football League members, using thirty-five players in their twenty-two game campaign. Indeed, the club have never fielded more players in any season since, despite having played as many as twenty league games more in over fifty subsequent seasons. So inconsistent was their team selection that at no time did the above combination actually take the field. Not surprisingly Everton's best result of the season, a 6–2 victory over Derby County on 20 October 1888 was achieved with ten of the above players on the field. Robert Watson missed that game while his deputy, Alex McKinnon scored the only hat-trick obtained by an Everton player all season. This was the only game in which ten of the first eleven featured.

Other players used
 Alec Dick (9 appearances – right back)
 David Waugh (7 apps – inside right)
 William Brown (6 apps – outside left)
 Alex McKinnon (6 apps – outside right)
 Alf Milward (6 apps – centre forward)
 Jack Angus (5 apps at outside left)
 George Fleming (4 apps – outside right)
 Charles Jolliffe (4 apps – goalkeeper)
 Wiliam Lewis (3 apps – centre forward)
 William Briscoe (3 apps – inside left)
 Albert Chadwick (2 apps – left back)
 Jas Coyne (2 apps – inside right)
 George Davie (2 apps – centre forward)
 Mike Higgins (1 app – centre half)
 Robert Jones (1 app – centre back)
 Bob Kelso (1 app – centre back),
 Jack Keys (1 app – centre forward)
 R Morris (1 app – centre forward)
 Henry Parkinson (1 app – centre half)
 Hugh Pollock (1 app – centre back)
 Roberts (1 app – centre back)
 George Stephenson (1 app – centre back)
 Harry Warmby (1 app – centre back)
 Walter Wilson (1 app – left back)

Note that position listed is that filled most commonly by the player during this season and may not always have been the role played.

League

Sources
 http://www.evertonfc.com/stats/?mode=players&era_id=1&season_id=2&seasons=2 
 http://www.allfootballers.com

1888-89
English football clubs 1888–89 season